Aleen May Bailey (born 25 November 1980) is a retired Jamaican track and field sprinter who competed in the 100 metres and 200 m.

Career
She competed in the 2004 Summer Olympics and won the gold medal as a member of the 4 × 100 m relay team. Bailey trains in Columbia, South Carolina under Curtis Frye and is the sister of the reggae star Capleton.

Bailey graduated from the University of South Carolina, where she competed during her Junior and Senior season after transferring from Barton County Community College.

In the 2003 NCAA Outdoor track and field championships, Bailey won the 100 and 200 meters, both times defeating heavily favored Muna Lee of LSU. She was also a member of the 4 × 100 m championship team at the 2002 outdoor championships.

Bailey competed for her native Jamaica at the 2004 Summer Olympics where she placed 5th in the 100 meters and 4th at the 200 meters. She teamed with 200 m champion Veronica Campbell, Tayna Lawrence, and Sherone Simpson to win the 4 × 100 m relay.

At the 2005 World Championships in Athletics she won (together with Daniele Browning, Sherone Simpson and Veronica Campbell-Brown) a silver medal. At the 2007 Pan American Games she finished fifth in the 200 m and won a gold medal in relay.

Bailey represented Jamaica at the 2008 Summer Olympics in Beijing. She competed at the 4 × 100 m relay together with Shelly-Ann Fraser-Pryce, Sheri-Ann Brooks and Veronica Campbell-Brown. In its first round heat, Jamaica placed first in front of Russia, Germany and China. The Jamaica relay's time of 42.24 seconds was the first time overall out of sixteen participating nations. With this result, Jamaica qualified for the final, replacing Brooks and Bailey with Sherone Simpson and Kerron Stewart. Jamaica did not finish the race due to a mistake in the baton exchange.

Personal bests
Her personal bests are:
100 m: 11.04
200 m: 22.33

Achievements

References

External links
 
 
 Aleen Bailey at uscsports.collegesports.com

1980 births
Living people
Jamaican female sprinters
South Carolina Gamecocks women's track and field athletes
Athletes (track and field) at the 1999 Pan American Games
Athletes (track and field) at the 2004 Summer Olympics
Athletes (track and field) at the 2008 Summer Olympics
Athletes (track and field) at the 2007 Pan American Games
Olympic athletes of Jamaica
Olympic gold medalists for Jamaica
People from Saint Mary Parish, Jamaica
World Athletics Championships medalists
Medalists at the 2004 Summer Olympics
Junior college women's track and field athletes in the United States
Pan American Games gold medalists for Jamaica
Olympic gold medalists in athletics (track and field)
Pan American Games medalists in athletics (track and field)
World Athletics Championships winners
Medalists at the 1999 Pan American Games
Medalists at the 2007 Pan American Games
Olympic female sprinters
21st-century American women